Komintern may refer to:
Comintern, a.k.a. communist International, an international communist organization that advocated world communism
Komintern (rural locality), several rural localities in Russia
Komintern, Kyrgyzstan, a village in Jalal-Abad Region, Kyrgyzstan
Komintern, the name of the T-24 tank#Artillery tractors
Soviet cruiser Komintern
Malyshev Factory (called Kharkov Komintern Locomotive Factory in 1927–38)